Mälarhöjden/Bredäng Hockey (often referred to as MB Hockey or MB) is an ice hockey club based in Stockholm, Sweden.

Founded: 1988
Arena: SDC-hallen (capacity 850)
Uniform colours: Red, white
Logo design: "MB" in red with white and blue trim in a stylized white maple leaf with red and blue trim
Swedish women's championships won: 7 (1999, 2000, 2001, 2002, 2003, 2005, 2006) 


History
Named after the districts where it is located, the club was founded in 1988 through a merger between Mälarhöjden/Västertorp and Bredäng/Östberga hockey clubs.

Until the 2006-07 season MB Hockey had sections for both men's and women's ice hockey, and while the men's team has never reached higher than the 3rd tier league, the women's team playing in the top level league established itself as one of the most successful in the nation, winning seven Swedish championships in eight years.

Before the start of the 2006-07 season the club decided to cancel their programme for women's hockey and a majority of the players went on to play for neighbouring Segeltorps IF.

Notable players
The most notable players on MB Hockey's women's team included six on the Swedish national women's ice hockey team that participated in the Turin 2006 Winter Olympic Games:
 Erika Holst - C
 Maria Rooth - A
 Gunilla Andersson - A
 Ann-Louise Edstrand
 Ylva Lindberg
 Jenny Lindqvist

References

External links
 Mälarhöjden/Bredäng Hockey's official website (in Swedish)

Sport in Stockholm
Ice hockey teams in Sweden
Ice hockey teams in Stockholm County